Bearfield Township is one of the fourteen townships of Perry County, Ohio, United States.  The 2000 census found 1,412 people in the township.

Communities
Milligan is an unincorporated area located at  within the northwest portion of the township.
San Toy is a ghost town located at  within the southeast portion of the township.

Geography
Located in the eastern part of the county, it borders the following townships:
Harrison Township - north
York Township, Morgan County - northeast
Deerfield Township, Morgan County - east
Union Township, Morgan County - southeastern corner
Monroe Township - south
Pleasant Township - southwest
Pike Township - west

No municipalities are located in Bearfield Township.

Name and history
It is the only Bearfield Township statewide.

Government
The township is governed by a three-member board of trustees, who are elected in November of odd-numbered years to a four-year term beginning on the following January 1. Two are elected in the year after the presidential election and one is elected in the year before it. There is also an elected township fiscal officer, who serves a four-year term beginning on April 1 of the year after the election, which is held in November of the year before the presidential election. Vacancies in the fiscal officership or on the board of trustees are filled by the remaining trustees.

References

External links
County website

Townships in Perry County, Ohio
Townships in Ohio